Mon Schjelderup (16 June 187021 November 1934)  was a Norwegian composer and pianist.

Biography
Maria Gustava Schjelderup was born in Fredrikshald (now Halden), Østfold, of parents Captain Christian Bernhard Koren Schjelderup (1819–1889) and Anne Sofie Preus Berg (1831–1898). She was also the cousin of composer Gerhard Schjelderup (1859–1933).

Schjelderup grew up in a musical home, and wrote her first composition at age 14. She studied piano with Agathe Backer Grøndahl. Later she continued her studies in piano and theory at the Royal Music Institute of Berlin, and in composition at the Conservatory in Paris with Jules Massenet. In 1894 she made her public debut as pianist and composer in Christiania. She continued her study with Massenet and began working as a composer and a piano teacher at the Music Conservatory in Christiania.

Mon Schjelderup never married and retired at the age of 34 due to disabling mental illness. She died in 1934 in Asker, Akershus.

Works
Schjelderup composed about forty songs, piano pieces, violin pieces, a sonata for violin and piano and orchestral works. Selected compositions include:

For Orchestra: 
Prelude to 5 Act II of The Wild Duck by Henrik Ibsen
Fest March, Op. 30, 1900 (arranged for orchestra by Jules Massenet)
For Violin and Piano: Berceuse, Op. 1, 1893
Ballade, Op. 2
2 Romances, Op. 6, 1894
Sonata in B minor, Op. 12, 1896

For cello and piano: 
Tungsind, op. 18, 1899

For voice and piano: 
2 Songs, Op. 10, 1899 (text W. Krag)
2 West View, op. 16, 1899 (text W. Krag)
Huldre Song, Op. 21, 1899 (text A. Garborg)
Nocturne, Scherzo, Op. 23, 1900 (text V. Krag)
Birch trees in Bridal Veil, op. 24 (text T. Caspari)
Jokes Mother To view and Fish Cutting, op. 33, 1902 (text A. Winge)
A loss, Op. 33, 1902 (text H. Christensen)
Poppy red, Op. 48, 1905 (text F. Docker-Smith)
Maria Nøklebånd, op. 61 (text F. Docker-Smith)
My love no soul on earth to be wide, Op. 63 (text S. Lagerlöf)
My Beloved dancer in Sale, op. 64(text L.C. Nielsen)
Nursery Rhymes, 1902
Songs (text W. Krag)

For piano: 
Au Printemps
3 Morceaux, Op. 3
2 Piano Pieces, Op. 13, 1898 (lullaby, Song without Words)
Trifles, 4 light piano pieces, 1903

References

1870 births
1934 deaths
19th-century classical composers
20th-century classical composers
Conservatoire de Paris alumni
Women classical composers
Norwegian classical composers
Norwegian classical pianists
Norwegian music educators
People from Halden
19th-century Norwegian composers
Women music educators
20th-century women composers
19th-century women composers
19th-century women pianists
20th-century women pianists